Megadenia is a genus of flowering plants belonging to the family Brassicaceae.

Its native range is Southern Siberia and Southern Russian Far East to Western and Central China.

Species:
 Megadenia pygmaea Maxim.

References

Brassicaceae
Brassicaceae genera